Union County is a county located in the north central portion of the U.S. state of Florida, the smallest in the state by area. As of the 2020 census, the population was 16,147. The county seat is Lake Butler. With a personal per capita income of $20,396 (as of 2017), it is the fourth-poorest county in the United States.

History
Union County was created in 1921 from part of Bradford County. It was named to honor the concept of unity. Union County is the location of Union Correctional Institution and the Reception and Medical Center (RMC). Union CI is a maximum security prison and is home to part of Florida's Death Row. The death chamber is located at nearby Florida State Prison (FSP) in Bradford County. Florida State Prison also houses some death-row inmates.

Geography
It is the smallest county by area in Florida.

Adjacent counties
 Baker County (north).
 Alachua County (south).
 Bradford County (east).
 Columbia County (west).

Demographics

As of the 2020 United States census, there were 16,147 people, 4,008 households, and 2,873 families residing in the county.

At the 2000 census, there were 13,442 people, 3,367 households and 2,606 families residing in the county. The population density was 56 per square mile (22/km2). There were 3,736 housing units at an average density of 16 per square mile (6/km2). The racial makeup of the county was 73.62% White, 22.84% Black or African American, 0.66% Native American, 0.31% Asian, 0.02% Pacific Islander, 1.04% from other races, and 1.50% from two or more races. 3.55% of the population were Hispanic or Latino of any race.

Of the 3,367 households, 41.80% had children under the age of 18 living with them, 57.70% were married couples living together, 15.00% had a female householder with no husband present, and 22.60% were non-families. 19.50% of all households were made up of individuals, and 7.10% had someone living alone who was 65 years of age or older. The average household size was 2.76 and the average family size was 3.13.

The age distribution was 21.80% under the age of 18, 8.70% from 18 to 24, 39.80% from 25 to 44, 22.20% from 45 to 64, and 7.50% who were 65 years of age or older. The median age was 36 years. For every 100 females there were 183.00 males. For every 100 females age 18 and over, there were 215.20 males. This extremely skewed gender distribution is the result of the county's male prison population.

The median household income was $34,563, and the median family income was $37,516. Males had a median income of $28,571 versus $22,083 for females. The county's per capita income was $12,333. About 10.50% of families and 14.00% of the population were below the poverty line, including 14.60% of those under age 18 and 16.20% of those age 65 or over.

The county suffers a death rate of about 1600 per 100,000 residents, the highest in the nation.

Government and infrastructure

The Florida Department of Corrections (FDOC) operates Region II Correctional Facility Office in an unincorporated area in Union County. FDOC also maintains the Union Correctional Institution in an unincorporated area in the county. Union Correctional Institution houses one of two death rows for men in Florida. About a third of the county's population is imprisoned, compared to a statewide figure of one-half percent.

The Union Juvenile Residential Facility of the Florida Department of Juvenile Justice is in an unincorporated area in Union County.

Education
Union County School District serves the county.

Libraries
The Union County Public Library serves the county. The branch is at 250 SE 5th Avenue, Lake Butler, Florida 32054. Its director is Mary C. Brown. The branch is open Monday, Wednesday–Friday 9 am–6 pm, Tuesday 9 am–8 pm, and Saturday 9 am–3 pm.

Transportation

Major roads

  State Road 16 
  State Road 18
  State Road 100 
  State Road 121
  State Road 231
  State Road 238

Communities

See also

 National Register of Historic Places listings in Union County, Florida

References

External links

 Union County Times newspaper that serves Union County, Florida available in full-text with images in Florida Digital Newspaper Library
 Union County Public Library - Website for Union County's library with links to government services and the tri-county area's library catalog.
 Lake Butler Community Page a non-official 'Community Page' created by a local resident to help share information about events and more occurring in the Union County/Lake Butler area.

Government links/Constitutional offices
 Union County Board of County Commissioners
 Union County Supervisor of Elections
 Union County Property Appraiser
 Union County Sheriff's Office
 Union County Tax Collector

Special districts
 Union County School Board
 Suwannee River Water Management District [Dead link 26 August 2016]

Judicial branch
 Union County Clerk of Courts
 Office of the State Attorney, 8th Judicial Circuit of Florida  serving Alachua, Baker, Bradford, Gilchrist, Levy and Union Counties
 Circuit and County Court for the 8th Judicial Circuit of Florida

 
1921 establishments in Florida
Populated places established in 1921
Florida counties
North Florida